Pool B (Wellington) of the 2020–21 Billie Jean King Cup Asia/Oceania Zone Group II was one of four pools in the Asia/Oceania zone of the 2020–21 Billie Jean King Cup. Four teams competed in a round robin competition, with the top team and the bottom teams proceeding to their respective sections of the play-offs: the top team played for advancement to Group I.

Standings 

Standings are determined by: 1. number of wins; 2. number of matches; 3. in two-team ties, head-to-head records; 4. in three-team ties, (a) percentage of matches won (head-to-head records if two teams remain tied), then (b) percentage of sets won (head-to-head records if two teams remain tied), then (c) percentage of games won (head-to-head records if two teams remain tied), then (d) Billie Jean King Cup rankings.

Round-robin

Thailand vs. Turkmenistan

Philippines vs. Guam

Turkmenistan vs. Guam

Thailand vs. Philippines

Thailand vs. Guam

Philippines vs. Turkmenistan

References

External links 
 Billie Jean King Cup website

2020–21 Billie Jean King Cup Asia/Oceania Zone